Sodom is the eleventh album by German thrash metal band Sodom, released on 21 April 2006. The first pressing was in a slipcase and includes a full-colour poster of the artwork. "The album is self-titled," Tom Angelripper explains, "because every band needs a self-titled album."

Track listing

Personnel
Tom Angelripper – vocals, bass guitar
 Bernd "Bernemann" Kost – guitars
Bobby Schottkowski – drums

Charts

References

Sodom (band) albums
2006 albums
SPV/Steamhammer albums